The tuber cinereum is a hollow eminence of the middle–ventral hypothalamus, specifically the arcuate nucleus, situated between the mammillary bodies and the optic chiasm. In addition to the ventral hypothalamus, the tuber cinereum includes the median eminence and pituitary gland. Together with the hollow itself, it is sometimes referred to as the pituitary stalk.

Structure 

The tuber cinereum is an inferior distention of the floor of the third ventricle; the conical hollow formed by the distention (a continuation of the ventricle itself), is known as the infundibulum (funnel). Thus, the tuber cinereum is anteriorly continuous with the lamina terminalis, while laterally it is continuous with the anterior perforated substances of the hypothalamus. The inferior end adjoins the posterior lobe of the pituitary gland.

Capillaries of the tuber cinereum are specialized and confluent to enable rapid communication via brain- or blood-borne factors between compartments of the tuber, a capillary system described as the hypophyseal portal system. The subregion of the hypothalamic arcuate nucleus closest to the median eminence contains specialized permeable capillaries surrounded by wide pericapillary spaces, enabling moment-to-moment sensing of circulating blood.

Function 

The tuber cinereum primarily constitutes nerve fibres travelling from the hypothalamus to the pituitary gland. Rather than providing signalling to the gland, many of these fibres actually function as the source of the substances released by the posterior lobe of this gland. Hence, the tuber cinereum functions as a rapid, high-concentration, hormonal route between the hypothalamus, median eminence, and pituitary gland, and from there into the general circulation.

Additional images

See also 
 hypothalamus
 tuber cinereum hamartoma

References

External links 
  - "Interpeduncular fossa" (#4)

Hypothalamus